Joseph, 4th Prince Kinsky of Wchinitz and Tettau (12 January 175111 August 1798) was the 4th Prince Kinsky of Wchinitz and Tettau.

Early life
Joseph was born at Vienna, Habsburg monarchy second son of Franz de Paula Ulrich, 3rd Prince Kinsky of Wchinitz and Tettau and Countess Maria Sidonie of Hohenzollern-Hechingen. He became the prince upon the death of his father in 1792.

Political career
Joseph became an Imperial chamberlain in 1767, Lord-in-waiting (wirklicher Kammerherr) in 1772, counsellor to the government of the Archduchy of Austria in 1774, and imperial counsellor in 1775. In this role he travelled extensively throughout Europe. He succeeded his father in 1792, becoming the 4th Prince Kinsky of Wchinitz and Tettau. At this stage he resigned his position in the state service.

He was a patron of Pavel Wranitzky (1756–1808) and other Moravian and Bohemian musicians in Vienna.

Marriage and family
Joseph married on 23 April 1777 in Vienna to Countess Rosa of Harrach of Rohrau and Thannhausen (1758–1814), youngest daughter of Ferdinand Bonaventura II von Harrach and his wife, Countess Maria Rosa of Harrach of Rohrau and Thannhausen.

They had four children:
Countess Maria Sidonia of Wchinitz and Tettau (12 February 1779 – 26 March 1837), married in 1796 to Anton Isidor, Prince of Lobkowicz; had issue.
Countess Maria Rosa Johanna of Wchinitz and Tettau (23 May 1780 – 16 March 1842), married to Franz Anton, Count of Kolowrat-Liebsteinsky (1778-1861).
Ferdinand, 5th Prince Kinsky of Wchinitz and Tettau (5 December 1781 – 3 November 1812), married in 1801 to Baroness Maria Charlotte Caroline of Kerpen; had issue.
Count Franz de Paula Joseph of Wchinitz and Tettau (23 March 1784 – 17 November 1823), married in 1809 to Countess Therese of Wrbna and Freudenthal; had issue.

Ancestry

Notes and sources
Genealogisches Handbuch des Adels, Fürstliche Häuser, Reference: 1956 548

|- 

1751 births
1798 deaths
Joseph
Nobility from Vienna